Morrin may refer to:

Places
Morrin, Iran, a village in Kerman Province, Iran
Morrin, Alberta, a village in Alberta, Canada

Facilities
Morrin College, the first anglophone institute of higher education in Quebec City, Quebec, Canada
Morrin Centre, a cultural centre in Quebec City, Quebec, Canada

People
Joseph Morrin (1794–1862), Scottish Canadian doctor and mayor
Thomas H. Morrin, an American engineer and the director of engineering at SRI International from 1948 to 1963
Wayne Morrin (born 1953), a retired Canadian professional ice hockey player
Brad Morrin (born 1981), an Australian professional rugby league footballer
Kurtis Morrin (born 2000), an Australian professional rugby league footballer

See also
Morin